Aegisthidae is a family of copepods belonging to the order Harpacticoida.

Genera

Genera:
 Aegisthus Giesbrecht, 1891
 Ameliotes Por, 1969
 Andromastax Conroy-Dalton & Huys, 1999

References

Copepods